Rakitnoye is an urban-type settlement in Belgorod Oblast, Russia and the administrative center of Rakityansky District and Rakitnoye urban settlement. Population: 

Located on the banks of the Dnieper River, Rakitnoye Basin. Final railway station Zinaidino on a branch of Gotnya Railway Station. Passenger movement there.

History
With the foundation settlement Rakitnoe (1652), called on the name of the same river, the surrounding land belonged to Kochubey's family, and, Alexander Danilovich Menshikov who was associate of Peter I. In 1728 the settlement was transferred to Prince Yusupov GD and until 1917 was the name of the Prince Yusupov control center in Kursk, Voronezh, Kharkov and Poltava governorates.

Status of urban-type settlements since 1975.

Landmarks
From Yusupovs manor remained the main house which built in 1846 for Prince Boris Yusupov, and several auxiliary buildings, which now housed the School of Arts, History Museum. Another landmark, St. Nicholas Church in the town, was built in 1832.

References

Cities and towns in Belgorod Oblast
Populated places in Rakityansky District
Grayvoronsky Uyezd